The Chennai Suburban Terminal, or Moore Market Complex (station code: MASS), is a railway terminus cum commercial building complex for the Chennai Suburban Railway system, situated in Park Town in Chennai, India. The name Moore Market comes from a market that used to exist at the site before being demolished to make way for the expansion of the MGR Central station.

History

Moore Market was originally built to house the hawkers in the Broadway area of Madras. Its foundation stone was laid by Sir George Moore, president of the Madras Corporation in 1898. The building was designed in the Indo-Saracenic style by R. E. Ellis and was constructed by A. Subramania Aiyar. The market, which consisted of a series of shops around a central quadrangle was finally completed in 1900, and had sections for meat, flowers and food items, but was particularly popular for curios including antiques, art, books and pets. Over the years, it gradually took the status of a flea market where one could buy rare and second hand items for a bargain.

The Indian Railways, needing land to expand the congested M.G.R Chennai Central station, tried unsuccessfully to take over the market. On 30 May 1985, the market building was destroyed due to a fire whose cause remains a mystery. The structure was later razed to make way for the new Chennai Suburban Railway terminus and reservation centre. This multistoreyed building also houses the offices of various departments of the railways. The demolition of the market and People's Park is considered to mark the beginning of heritage activism in the city.

Rehabilitation
The government later built a new commercial complex named Lily Pond Complex to rehabilitate the traders of Moore Market, further west of the original site. Built in 1986 at a cost of  66 million, the shopping complex lies mostly vacant due to poor patronage. Majority of the traders continue to live on the streets to this day, hawking used mechanical and electronic goods.

Traffic
The station has five platforms, viz., platform numbers 12, 13, 14, 15 and 16, which are technically continuous with platforms in the M.G.R Chennai Central main railway station. With the laying of two additional lines in September 2016, there are now six lines running between the station and the Basin Bridge railway station. The station caters to about 275 train services daily and is used by about 200,000 passengers every day.

See also
 Chennai Central railway station
 Chennai Suburban Railway
 Railway stations in Chennai

References

External links 

Stations of Chennai Suburban Railway
Railway stations in Chennai